Stow cum Quy , commonly referred to as Quy, is a village and civil parish in Cambridgeshire, England.

Origin of the name
The village's name derives from the joining together of two settlements, one called Stow, meaning "high or holy place", that was around the present location of Quy church and Quy coming from Cowey or "Cow Island", the area around the Swan pub. Cum is Latin for "with". It was referred to as "Stowe Quye" in medieval times.

History
The area has been occupied for millennia and Bronze Age remains have been found in the parish. A Roman villa has been found just to the west of Quy Hall. 
The Saxon Fleam Dyke runs close by the village. The two Saxon settlements of Stow and Quy built up on a raised area at the southern edge of The Fens that ran north all the way to Lincolnshire. The settlements were already joined by 1066, though had separate manors, and became a single ecclesiastical parish by the early 13th century. Stow was the area around the present parish church, and Quy around The Swan public house.

Jeremy Collier (1650–1727), the bishop and theatre critic, was born in the village and has a street named after him. The oldest parts of the parish church of St Mary at Stow End date from the 12th century. The nave and chancel were built around 1340. A Wesleyan chapel was built in 1840 but closed just after the Second World War and was demolished when the Wheatsheaf pub was extended.

Village life

Quy currently supports three public houses. The White Swan, or Swan, a timber-framed house, was open by 1750. The Prince Albert opened in the 1840s on the Newmarket Road and was renamed The Missing Sock after refurbishment in 2010. The Wheatsheaf at Stow End opened in the late 19th century. Former pubs in the village were The Plough which opened in the late 18th century and was perhaps replaced by The Bush which was open from 1821 to 1904.

The village sign was erected to commemorate the Silver Jubilee of Elizabeth II. Children initially attend Bottisham Primary School in the nearby village and usually then go on to Bottisham Village College.

Nearby are a number of places of interest including the National Trust property of Anglesey Abbey and Quy Fen a Site of Special Scientific Interest (SSSI). Another nearby conservation area is Wilbraham Fen and there are several picturesque walks around the village.

Transport

The village is just off the A14 via the Quy interchange and is about two miles from the Newmarket Road Park and Ride. There is a bus service running between Cambridge and Newmarket passing through the neighbouring villages of Bottisham, Lode and Burwell. Cycle access is good thanks to a number of cycle paths.

Nearby villages 
 Bottisham
 Lode
 Teversham

References

External links

The White Swan pub
Stow-cum-Quy Parish Council website

Villages in Cambridgeshire
Civil parishes in Cambridgeshire
South Cambridgeshire District